Płomyczek ('Little flame') is a Polish children's magazine established in 1917. It was created to accompany Płomyk, a magazine for older children and teens (defunct since 1991). Płomyczek is published in Warsaw.

References

Magazines established in 1917
Children's magazines published in Poland
Polish-language magazines
Magazines published in Warsaw